Below is a list with links to further Wikipedia-pages containing lists of exonyms of various European languages for villages, towns, and cities in Europe.

Albanian exonyms
Basque exonyms
Bulgarian exonyms
Catalan exonyms
Croatian exonyms
Czech exonyms
Danish exonyms
Dutch exonyms
English exonyms
Estonian exonyms
Finnish exonyms
French exonyms
Galician exonyms
German exonyms
German exonyms (Moselle)
Greek exonyms
Hungarian exonyms
Icelandic exonyms
Irish exonyms
Italian exonyms
Latvian exonyms
Lithuanian exonyms
Luxembourgish exonyms
Maltese exonyms
Old Norse exonyms
Norwegian exonyms
Polish exonyms
Portuguese exonyms
Romanian exonyms
Romansh exonyms
Russian exonyms
Rusyn exonyms (Vojvodina)
Serbian exonyms
Slovak exonyms
Slovenian exonyms
Spanish exonyms
Swedish exonyms
Ukrainian exonyms
Welsh exonyms

See also
Latin exonyms
List of English exonyms for German toponyms
List of European regions with alternative names
List of European rivers with alternative names
List of French exonyms for Dutch toponyms
List of French exonyms for German toponyms
List of French exonyms for Italian toponyms
List of Latin place names in Continental Europe
List of European rivers with alternative names
List of traditional Greek place names
Names of Belarusian places in other languages
Names of European cities in different languages
Names of Lithuanian places in other languages

External links 
 Exomni.narod.ru, Exonyms in Central and Eastern Europe (a .doc file)

Europe
Exonyms
Europe geography-related lists